Ozalj (or Woseil) is a town in central Croatia, located north of Karlovac and southwest of Jastrebarsko, on the Kupa River. It is close to Žumberak in the north and the border with Slovenia in the northwest, with Metlika being the closest Slovenian town.

History

The town was built on a cliff over the Kupa river and the first mention of it dates from 1244, as a free royal town. The Frankopan family owned it since 1398, then it passed to the Zrinski family in 1550, and it stayed theirs until 1671. The city commemorates 30 April as its day, in memory of the event in 1671 when Petar Zrinski and Fran Krsto Frankopan were executed.

The patron saint of the town is St. Vitus, whose feast is celebrated on 15 June.

Munjara 
Munjara is the old hydroelectric plant. This plant has three 3.5 megawatt generators and was built between 1907 and 1908.

Population

The town of Ozalj itself has a population of 1,181, with a total of 6,817 people in the municipality. 97% of the population are Croats (census 2011).

The administrative area of the Town consists of 96 smaller settlements, the full list of which is:

 Badovinci, population 23
 Belinsko Selo, population 1
 Belošići, population 25
 Boševci, population 64
 Brašljevica, population 33
 Bratovanci, population 60
 Brezje Vivodinsko, population 8
 Breznik, population 6
 Brezovica Žumberačka, population 19
 Budim Vivodinski, population 15
 Bulići, population 2
 Cerje Vivodinsko, population 22
 Cvetišće, population 0
 Dančulovići, population 24
 Dojutrovica, population 37
 Doljani Žumberački, population 21
 Donji Lović, population 20
 Donji Oštri Vrh Ozaljski, population 47
 Dragoševci, population 7
 Dučići, population 21
 Durlinci, population 90
 Dvorišće Ozaljsko, population 49
 Dvorište Vivodinsko, population 27
 Ferenci, population 51
 Fratrovci Ozaljski, population 48
 Furjanići, population 32
 Galezova Draga, population 27
 Galin, population 4
 Goleši Žumberački, population 4
 Goli Vrh Ozaljski, population 6
 Gorniki Vivodinski, population 34
 Gornje Pokupje, population 160
 Gornji Lović, population 41
 Gornji Oštri Vrh Ozaljski, population 6
 Goršćaki Ozaljski, population 11
 Grandić Breg, population 37
 Grdun, population 136
 Gudalji, population 0
 Hodinci, population 31
 Hrastovica Vivodinska, population 0
 Ilovac, population 35
 Jaškovo, population 490
 Kamenci, population 0
 Kašt, population 45
 Keseri, population 5
 Kuljaji, population 11
 Kunčani, population 0
 Levkušje, population 194
 Liješće (Ozalj), population 37
 Lović Prekriški, population 72
 Lukšići Ozaljski, population 46
 Lukunić Draga, population 24
 Mali Erjavec, population 154
 Malinci, population 0
 Novaki Ozaljski, population 61
 Obrež Vivodinski, population 84
 Ozalj, population 1,181
 Pećarići, population 2
 Petruš Vrh, population 10
 , population 22
 Podbrežje, population 321
 Podgraj, population 113
 Police Pirišće, population 81
 Polje Ozaljsko, population 267
 Popovići Žumberački, population 0
 Požun, population 35
 Radatovići, population 22
 Radina Vas, population 7
 Rajakovići, population 0
 Rujevo, population 11
 Sekulići, population 4
 Slapno, population 275
 Soldatići, population 20
 Sršići, population 6
 Stojavnica, population 26
 Svetice, population 21
 Svetičko Hrašće, population 127
 Šiljki, population 5
 Škaljevica, population 59
 Tomašnica, population 158
 Trešćerovac, population 84
 Trg, population 195
 Varaštovac, population 11
 Veliki Erjavec, population 13
 Vini Vrh, population 4
 Vivodina, population 87
 Vrbanska Draga, population 20
 Vrhovac, population 354
 Vrhovački Sopot, population 89
 Vrškovac, population 123
 Vuketić, population 22
 Vuksani, population 9
 Zajačko Selo, population 164
 Zaluka, population 34
 Zorkovac, population 209
 Zorkovac na Kupi, population 103
 Zorkovac Vivodinski, population 16

Notable people

 Juraj Križanić (1618–1683), earliest recorded pan-Slavist.
 Slava Raškaj (1877–1906), painter
 John Malkovich's paternal grandparents
 Jelena Zrinski (1643–1703), countess

References

External links

 

Cities and towns in Croatia
Populated places in Karlovac County